Continental Aircraft Corporation was an American aircraft manufacturer based in Amityville, New York. The company also maintained offices at 120 Liberty Street, in New York. Continental's chief engineer was Vincent Burnelli, a future advocate of lifting body aircraft.

The company built the Christmas Bullet scout aircraft for the Cantilever Aero Company. Both prototypes suffered structural failure of their thin cantilevered wings, killing test pilots Cuthbert Mills and Allington Jolly.

Aircraft

References

Defunct aircraft manufacturers of the United States